Martin Baron (born October 24, 1954) is an American journalist who was editor of The Washington Post from December 31, 2012, until he retired on February 28, 2021. He was the editor of The Boston Globe from 2001 to 2012.

Baron achieved prominence in 2015 and 2016 through his portrayal in the film Spotlight and his involvement in the January 2016 release of Jason Rezaian, the Tehran bureau chief for The Washington Post, who was imprisoned in Iran for 18 months.

Early life and education

Baron was born to a Jewish family in Tampa, Florida. His parents immigrated from Israel. He attended Berkeley Preparatory School and worked on the school's student paper. He matriculated at Lehigh University where he was editor of The Brown and White student newspaper. He received special permission to take graduate classes as an undergraduate and graduated in 1967, having earned both a bachelor of arts in journalism and MBA with honors in four years. Baron is fluent in Spanish.

Career
In 1976, after graduation, Baron began working for The Miami Herald; he moved to The Los Angeles Times in 1979, and to The New York Times in 1996. He returned to the Herald as executive editor in 2000 and led coverage of numerous key stories, including Elián González's return to Cuba and the 2000 election.

In July 2001, Baron succeeded Matthew V. Storin as executive editor of The Boston Globe. His editorial term at the Globe shifted the paper's coverage from international events toward locally centered investigative journalism. The Globes coverage of the Boston Catholic sexual abuse scandal earned it a Pulitzer Prize in 2003.

In 2012, Baron was inducted into the American Academy of Arts and Sciences.

The Washington Post
In January 2013, Baron succeeded Marcus Brauchli as executive editor of The Washington Post. In 2014, the Post won two Pulitzer Prizes, one in the category of public service for revelations of secret surveillance by the National Security Agency and the other for explanatory journalism about food stamps in America. The next year, it won the Pulitzer Prize for national reporting for its coverage of security lapses in the Secret Service; in 2016, it won the Pulitzer Prize in the category of national reporting for a groundbreaking project that chronicled every killing by a police officer in 2015. The next year, it won the Pulitzer Prize for national reporting for exposing Donald Trump's claims of charitable giving and the Access Hollywood tape. In 2018, it won two Pulitzer Prizes, one in the category of investigative reporting for revealing allegations of sexual misconduct by Roy Moore and the other for national reporting on Russian interference in the 2016 presidential election.

Baron supervised the writing team, including co-authors Michael Kranish and Marc Fisher, that researched the 2016 biography Trump Revealed: An American Journey of Ambition, Ego, Money, and Power.

For his work in journalism, Baron was awarded the 2016 Hitchens Prize. In 2017, he received the Al Neuharth Award for Excellence in Media.

In May 2019, Baron said in defense of WikiLeaks founder Julian Assange: "Dating as far back as the Pentagon Papers case and beyond, journalists have been receiving and reporting on information that the government deemed classified. Wrongdoing and abuse of power were exposed. With the new indictment of Julian Assange, the government is advancing a legal argument that places such important work in jeopardy and undermines the very purpose of the First Amendment."

In January 2020, Baron criticized a Post reporter who sent a Tweet about the Kobe Bryant sexual assault case after Bryant's death. The reporter, Felicia Sonmez, was later suspended. The Washington Post guild criticized the move and she was reinstated. Baron issued a three-page statement but did not apologize.

In January 2021, via an internal memo, Baron announced his retirement from The Washington Post effective February 28, 2021. In his note, he advocated for Section 230 protections for social media companies.

Popular culture
In the 2015 film Spotlight, which focuses on The Boston Globes coverage of the Boston Catholic Church's priest child molestation scandal, Baron is played by Liev Schreiber. The film won the award for Best Picture at the 88th Academy Awards.

References

External links

1954 births
20th-century American Jews
American people of Israeli descent
Living people
Writers from Tampa, Florida
Lehigh University alumni
Miami Herald people
The New York Times corporate staff
The New York Times editors
The Boston Globe people
Fellows of the American Academy of Arts and Sciences
20th-century American journalists
American male journalists
21st-century American newspaper editors
21st-century American Jews